American singer Dawn Robinson has released one album, four singles (including three as a featured artist), and one music video, along with various non-single guest appearances.

Studio albums

Singles

As lead artist

As featured artist

Album appearances

Soundtrack appearances

See also
 En Vogue discography
 Lucy Pearl discography
 List of best-selling girl groups

References

External links 

 

Rhythm and blues discographies
Discographies of American artists
Soul music discographies